This is a list of hospitals in the U.S. state of Florida.

Acute care hospitals
According to the American Hospital Directory, there were 325 hospitals in Florida in 2020.

Closed hospitals

Other hospitals 
There are several Long term acute care hospitals and inpatient rehab facilities in the state

References

Florida
 List
Hospitals
Sarasota Animal Medical Center